The Sorrow is the third full-length by the Melodic metalcore band The Sorrow. It was released on October 29, 2010 through Drakkar Records.

Track listing

2010 albums
The Sorrow albums